E-Yantra (stylized as 'e-Yantra) is robotics focused educational outreach initiative of the Department of Computer Science and Engineering at the Indian Institute of Technology, Bombay (IIT Bombay). It is funded by the Ministry of Education, Government of India, under the National Mission on Education through ICT (NMEICT). The goal of e-Yantra is to complement existing engineering and robotoics Higher Education systems worldwide and develop engineers capable of solving local problems across a variety of domains such as: Agriculture, Disaster Response, Defense, Manufacturing, Home, Smart Cities and Service Industries through technology.

 History 
In 2002, Prof. Kavi Arya started the distance education program at IIT Bombay, and was Program Coordinatior teching teaching Embedded Systems, as the Program Coordinator. However, the tools and robots required for this were very expensive and remote students couldn't afford the equipment themselves. To compensate for this gap, the e-Yantra Project was initiated.

 Mission 
The mission of this project is to create the next generation of engineers with a practical outlook to help in providing pragmatic solutions to real-world problems. The initiative seeks to provide hands-on learning-infrastructure to engineering students who have limited access to labs and mentors.

 e-Yantra Robotics Competition 
The e-Yantra Robotics Competition (eYRC) is the flagship initiative of the e-Yantra project. The competition is open to students from an engineering or polytechnic background and comprises 2 stages spanning over 6–7 months. Stage 1 is open to all and is a Robotics MOOC (Massive Online Open Course). During the competition, the participating teams are assigned “themes" with varying levels of complexity that are abstractions of real-world problems. 

A selected cohort from Stage 1 is admitted into Stage 2. The leading 5-6 teams from Stage 2 are hosted for the National Finals at IIT Bombay in March every year where they demonstrate their projects before a jury. In 2020, the competition wasexpanded to international students by reaching out to regional associations like The Association of Southeast Asian Nations (ASEAN), Bay of Bengal Initiative for Multi-Sectoral Technical and Economic Cooperation (BIMSTEC) and two countries in Africa (Namibia and South Africa). Winners receive a cash prize.

 e-Yantra Innovation Challenge 
The e-Yantra Innovation Challenge (eYIC') encourages participants to come up with innovative solutions to real-world problems through a common technology stack in the competition.

References

External links
 https://www.indiatoday.in/education-today/news/story/jamia-millia-islamia-students-win-competition-hosted-by-iit-bombay-1703859-2020-07-24
 https://www.thehindu.com/news/cities/mumbai/a-bot-from-next-door/article26681549.ece
 https://starofmysore.com/two-sjce-teams-excel-at-e-yantra-robotics-contest/
 https://mumbaimirror.indiatimes.com/mumbai/other/nature-inspires-drones-bots-at-iit-b-contest/articleshow/68639419.cms
 https://www.hindustantimes.com/mumbai-news/in-mumbai-now-a-robot-that-can-deliver-medicines-to-patients/story-FhvUXOUUwuvZbBfECFvzXN.html
 https://www.livemint.com/Leisure/MyWz9cIg9VJpxZeCuBpl7K/Solving-realworld-issues-the-IITB-way.html
 https://www.livemint.com/technology/tech-news/students-in-india-are-making-robots-that-will-serve-society-1569602641265.html

Robotics projects
Distance education in India
Robotics competitions